Urko Arroyo Rivas (born 14 May 1987) is a Spanish footballer who plays for Atlético Mancha Real as a right winger.

Club career
Arroyo was born in Bilbao, Biscay. After passing through the various youth ranks at local Athletic Bilbao, he would make two appearances with the first team: the first arrived on 23 April 2006, as he played five minutes in a 0–3 home loss against Valencia CF. The other only came two years later, also in La Liga, in a 4–1 away defeat to Sevilla FC.

Released by Athletic in the summer of 2009, Arroyo joined Basque neighbours Barakaldo CF in the third division. He continued competing in that tier the following years, in representation of a host of clubs.

Arroyo moved abroad for the first time in 2018, with the 31-year-old signing for Europa F.C. from the Gibraltar Premier Division.

References

External links

1987 births
Living people
Spanish footballers
Footballers from Bilbao
Association football wingers
La Liga players
Segunda División B players
Tercera División players
CD Basconia footballers
Bilbao Athletic footballers
Athletic Bilbao footballers
CD Atlético Baleares footballers
Barakaldo CF footballers
CD San Roque de Lepe footballers
SD Amorebieta footballers
CD Toledo players
Real Jaén footballers
Lleida Esportiu footballers
Lorca FC players
UCAM Murcia CF players
Gibraltar Premier Division players
Europa F.C. players
Spanish expatriate footballers
Expatriate footballers in Gibraltar
Spanish expatriate sportspeople in Gibraltar